No Doubt is an American rock band.

No Doubt may also refer to:

 No Doubt (702 album), 1996
 No Doubt (No Doubt album), 1992
 No Doubt (Petra album), 1995